Stenotrophomonas pavanii is a nitrogen-fixing, Gram-negative, rod-shaped and non-spore-forming bacterium from the genus of Stenotrophomonas which has been isolated from the stem of a sugar cane from Sao Francisco Sertaozinho in Brazil.

References 

Xanthomonadales
Bacteria described in 2011